Rispenserpoldermolen  is a smock mill in Easterein, Friesland, Netherlands, which was rebuilt in 1994. The mill is listed as a Rijksmonument, number 21572.

History

Rispenserpoldermolen was built in 1821 by millwright Arjen Gerbens Timmenga of Easterein to drain the Rispenserpolder. It was first set to work on 27 November 1821. It was worked until 1964. In 1966 it was in the ownership of the Gemeente Hennaarderadeel. A restoration of the mill was undertaken in 1968. The mill was dismantled in 1993, and rebuilt at a new site  to the north in Easterein in 1994. The mill  was officially reopened on Nationale Molendag, 1995.

Description

Rispenserpoldermolen is what the Dutch describe as a "grondzeiler". It is a two-storey smock mill on a single-storey base. There is no stage, the sail reaching almost to the ground. The smock is thatched and the cap covered in vertical boards. The mill is winded by tailpole and winch. The sails are Common sails. The sails are carried on a wood and steel windshaft made by J H Westra  of Franeker. The windshaft also carries the brake wheel, which has 38 cogs. This drives the wallower (20 cogs) at  the top of the upright shaft. At the bottom of the upright shaft, the crown wheel, which has 33 cogs drives a gearwheel with 29 cogs on the axle of the wooden Archimedes' screw. The screw is inclined at 24.6°.

Public access
Rispenserpoldermolen is open to the public by appointment.

Culture
A black board in the mill has a poem by the mill's builder, Arjen Gerbens Timmenga. Author Anton Sipman comments that Timmenga was a better millwright than he was a poet.

References

Windmills in Friesland
Windmills completed in 1994
Smock mills in the Netherlands
Windpumps in the Netherlands
Rijksmonuments in Friesland
Octagonal buildings in the Netherlands
1994 establishments in the Netherlands
20th-century architecture in the Netherlands